This list of arrondissements of Marseille, France, include their INSEE code, postal code, sectors and neighbourhoods.

List

Prevolutionary parishes

Before the French Revolution, the town had five parishes:
 La Major
 Les Accoules
 Saint-Laurent
 Saint-Martin
 Saint-Ferréol

It also included three parishes outside the town:
 Saint-Julien
 Saint-Marcel
 Château Gombert

References

 INSEE